Just Being Honest is the sixth comedy album by Craig Ferguson.

Award and nominations 
The album was nominated for Best Comedy Album in the 58th Grammy Awards.

External links 
Official Epix page

Stand-up comedy concert films
Works by Craig Ferguson
Live comedy albums
Spoken word albums by American artists
Live spoken word albums
2015 albums
Stand-up comedy albums